Yim Chun-chu (March 8, 1912 – April 27, 1988) was a North Korean politician. He served as Vice President of North Korea, and member of the Politburo of the Workers' Party of Korea. He was a member of the guerrilla faction.

Biography
He was born in Yanji, Jilin, China, in 1912, and joined the anti-Japanese guerrillas in the early 1930s. Since the early 1930s, he has been working with Kim Il-sung as a military surgeon in the guerrilla army, and is the "first generation of revolution" that passed through the 88th International Brigade of the Northeast Anti-Japanese Army and the Soviet Far East.

In 1945, he became Secretary of the Ping An South Road of the Communist Party of Korea. In April 1947, invited by Zhou Baozhong to serve as an officer in Antu County, Jilin Province. In March 1948, he served as a member of the Yanbian Administrative Inspector's Office and deputy secretary of the Yanbian District Committee.

Following its official proclamation, he returned to North Korea in January 1949 and June 1950. He served as chairman of the Kangwon Province Party Committee, and in December 1950 lost his footing and was criticized together with Wu Ting, Jin Yi, and Cui Guang.

He was appointed vice president in April 1983, and died in April 1988.

Yim died on April 27, 1988. He was awarded a state funeral with a funeral committee consisting of 57 persons including Kim Il-sung, Kim Jong-il, and O Jin-u.

Works

References

1912 births
1988 deaths
North Korean diplomats
Members of the Supreme People's Assembly
Vice presidents of North Korea
People from Yanbian
Members of the 6th Politburo of the Workers' Party of Korea
Members of the 6th Central Committee of the Workers' Party of Korea
People of 88th Separate Rifle Brigade